Allomyces reticulatus is a species of fungus from the United States.

References

Fungi described in 1974
Fungi of the United States
Blastocladiomycota
Fungi without expected TNC conservation status